Yellow Mountain is located in the Lewis Range, Glacier National Park in the U.S. state of Montana. Yellow Mountain forms a high ridge and connects Sherburne Peak in the east to Seward Mountain to the west.

See also
 Mountains and mountain ranges of Glacier National Park (U.S.)

References

Yellow
Yellow
Lewis Range
Mountains of Montana